Palaeotropidae is a family of echinoderms belonging to the order Spatangoida.

Genera:
 Kermabrissoides Baker, 1998
 Palaeobrissus A.Agassiz, 1883
 Palaeotropus Lovén, 1874
 Paleotrema Koehler, 1914
 Scrippsechinus Allison, Durham & Mintz, 1967

References

Spatangoida